Chernovite-(Y) is a mineral. It was first described in 1967 as Chernovite, named after the Russian geologist Aleksandr A. Chernov. The suffix -(Y) was added in 1987. It is a colourless to pale yellow mineral with a vitreous luster. It has a tetragonal crystalline structure, and has the chemical makeup of Y(AsO₄), which is yttrium, arsenic, and oxygen, at a 1:1:4 ratio. It has a specific gravity of 4.866g/cm3.

Chernovite-(Y) is part of the Xenotime group.

See also 
 Chernovite-(Ce)

References

External links 
 
 

Yttrium minerals
Arsenate minerals
Tetragonal minerals
Minerals described in 1967